Saint-Césaire is a railway station in Saint-Césaire, a quarter of Nîmes, Occitanie, southern France. Within TER Occitanie, it is part of lines 21 (Narbonne–Avignon) and 26 (Nîmes-Le Grau-du-Roi).

References

Railway stations in Gard